Anvil is a ghost town in Lincoln County, in the U.S. state of Oklahoma.

History
The community was settled after the Oklahoma Land Rush of 1889, and named for an anvil-shaped rock near the town site. A post office was established at Anvil in 1892, and remained in operation until 1904.

References

Geography of Lincoln County, Oklahoma
Ghost towns in Oklahoma